Zachariasz Nowoszycki (died 14 March 1641) was a Roman Catholic prelate who served as Auxiliary Bishop of Lviv (1634–1641) and Titular Bishop of  Nicopolis in Epiro (1634–1641).

Biography
On 4 Dec 1634, Zachariasz Nowoszycki was appointed during the papacy of Pope Urban VIII as Auxiliary Bishop of Lviv and Titular Bishop of Nicopolis in Epiro.
On 21 Dec 1634, he was consecrated bishop by Cosimo de Torres, Archbishop of Monreale. 
He served as Auxiliary Bishop of Lviv until his death on March 14, 1641.

References

External links and additional sources
 (for Chronology of Bishops) 
 (for Chronology of Bishops)  
 (for Chronology of Bishops) 

17th-century Roman Catholic bishops in the Polish–Lithuanian Commonwealth
Bishops appointed by Pope Urban VIII
1641 deaths